Nothing to Fear was the first home produced album that MC Lars, then known as Lars Horris, released under his first label in high school "Noseman Records".  It was limited to 200 copies and was distributed amongst classmates at Robert Louis Stevenson School and his dorm, Junipero, at Stanford University.

Track listing 
Going for Your Ear
Peaceful Defenseless People
Pop Goes the Icon
Porcine Financial Issues
I Want to be Anakin Skywalker
Aliens in my Cereal
Bill the Biogeneticist
Faith & Wisdom
Lobster Boy
Miles Davis' Calculator
Rapbeth (Foul is Fair)
Digest this DJ
Strobelights & Special K
Transylvania
Rhythmic Theories
Lego Man
Heal

References

1999 albums
MC Lars albums